Utah Valley Hospital (UVH) is a 395-bed full-service tertiary and acute care referral center serving Utah County, central and southern Utah that is part of the Intermountain Healthcare system. It is a Level II Trauma Center. The name of the hospital was officially changed from Utah Valley Regional Medical Center (UVRMC).

History 
Originally founded in 1939 as Utah Valley Hospital, UVH was equipped with 55 bed and 38 physicians. By 1953 through request of the board of directors, The Church of Jesus Christ of Latter-day Saints assumed ownership of Utah Valley Hospital. Utah Valley Hospital became the first fully staffed 24-hour emergency center south of Salt Lake City by 1970.

In 1975, The Church of Jesus Christ of Latter-day Saints donated its network of hospitals, including UVH, to a new independent nonprofit entity, Intermountain Health Care, which has operated the hospitals ever since.

By 1984, the name of the hospital was officially changed to Utah Valley Regional Medical Center (UVRMC). The name change reflected growth of the facility and services, making it one of Utah's largest major referral centers, serving all of central and southern Utah and its surrounding areas.

In 2014 the hospital celebrated its 75th anniversary, and a major hospital replacement project is announced to eventually replace the East Tower and provide the latest technology and medical services to the community which would be set to start in 2015. The construction and replacement project included a 12-story patient tower on the southwest corner of campus, and a nine-story medical office building on the east side of campus. By 2016, the name of the hospital was officially changed back to Utah Valley Hospital. As Utah Valley Hospital grew, it continued its evolution as a place of learning, a place of caring, and a place of healing. It also opened the Utah Valley Hospital Primary Children's Network which offered the best pediatric care for patients and their families, close to home.

Offered programs include the Utah Valley Heart Center, the Newborn Intensive Care Unit (NICU) and Cancer Services. Other services include Emergency and Trauma Services, Critical Care, Women's and Children's Services, Behavioral Health and the Utah Valley Rehabilitation Center. The UVRMC Cancer Center treats more than 20 forms of cancer.  Life Flight has one of its air ambulance helicopters stationed at UVRMC.

References

External links
 
 

Hospital buildings completed in 1939
Hospitals in Utah County, Utah
Intermountain Health
Buildings and structures in Provo, Utah
1939 establishments in Utah
Trauma centers